Eurosia lineata is a moth of the family Erebidae. It is found in South Africa.

References

 Natural History Museum Lepidoptera generic names catalog

Endemic moths of South Africa
Nudariina
Moths described in 1900